"Serrinha" is also the name of a microregion in Bahia.
Serrinha is a city in the state of Bahia, in eastern Brazil.

Geography

The population is 81,286 people. The mayor is Adriano Lima of the Brazilian Social Democracy Party.

The city is the seat of the Roman Catholic Diocese of Serrinha.

History 
The town's founding date is June 13, 1876.

References

External links 

Municipalities in Bahia